John or Jack Heron may refer to:
John Heron (social scientist), British social scientist
John Heron (MP), member of parliament for Northumberland
Sir John Heron (courtier) (1470–1522), English courtier
Jack Heron (cricketer), Zimbabwean cricketer
Jack Heron (basketball), American basketball coach
Sir John Heron, 2nd Baronet (1654–1693) of the Heron baronets

See also
John Heron-Maxwell
John Herron (disambiguation)